Vocea României Junior was the Romanian version of The Voice Kids created by the executive producer of Fear Factor and creator of Star Academy, John de Mol. Vocea României Junior began airing on 26 February 2017 on Pro TV and Pro TV Chișinău.  Based on the original The Voice of Holland, the concept of the series was to find new singing talent contested by aspiring singers with the age limit being 7–14 years old, drawn from public auditions. The winner was determined by public and he was entitled to a €50,000 prize. The first season was won by Maia Mălăncuș, and the second season by Maya Ciosa.

The hosts of the series were Robert Tudor and Mihai Bobonete. The coaches of the series were INNA, Andra and Marius Moga. As of 2023, plans for a third season were not announced.

History
In March 2014, ProTV announced their intention to turn season 4 into a children's competition, according to The Voice Kids format, but they changed their minds a month later and decided to have a competition for people ages 16 and up, as in previous years.

In early 2016 it was announced that Pro TV had ordered The Voice Kids, a junior version of Vocea României.

Format
One of the important premises of the show was the quality of the singing talent. Three coaches, themselves popular performing artists, trained the talents in their teams and occasionally performed with them. Talents were selected in blind auditions, where the coaches couldn't see, but only hear the auditioner.
There were four phases to the competition:
 Stage 1: Blind Auditions
 Stage 2: Battle Rounds
 Stage 3: Semi-Final
 Stage 4: Live Final

Blind Auditions
Three judges/coaches, all famous musicians, chose teams of 9 contestants each through a four-episode-long blind audition process. Each judge had the length of the auditionee's performance to decide if they want that singer on their team; if two or more judges wanted the same singer then the singer got to choose which coach they wanted to work with.

Battle Rounds
In the "Battle Rounds," each coach grouped three of their team members to perform together, then chose one to advance in the competition.

Semi-final
In the Semi-final three artists within a team sang individual performances in succession. At the conclusion of the performances, their coach then decided out of the three artists who won.

Live Final
The Final (the winner round) was decided upon by public vote.

Hosts and coaches

Hosts
In July 2016 Mihai Bobonete and Robert Tudor were confirmed hosts for the Voice of Romania Junior.

Coaches
In June 2016 pop singer and judge at Românii au talent, Andra, singer, dancer and philanthropist, INNA, and R&B musician, composer and adult show coach, Marius Moga were confirmed coaches for the Voice of Romania Junior.

Series overview
To date, one season has been broadcast as summarised below.
 Team Andra
 Team Moga
 Team Inna

Season synopses 
Names in bold type indicate the winner of the season.

Season 1 

The first season of The Voice of Romania Junior premiered on February 26, 2017 and concluded on 9 April. The Judges were pop singer and judge at Românii au talent, Andra, singer, dancer and philanthropist, INNA and R'n'B musician, composer and former adult show coach, Marius Moga. Mihai Bobonete with Robert Tudor were the hosts. Contestant auditions were held in Cluj-Napoca, Timișoara, Iași, Brașov and Bucharest during March and April 2016.

Each coach was allowed to advance three contestants to the live shows:

Season 2 

Season two premiered on June 8, 2018 and concluded on July 20, 2018. All coaches and hosts from last season returned.

Each coach was allowed to advance three contestants to the live shows:

Ratings

References

Romanian television shows
Television series about children
Television series about teenagers
Pro TV original programming